Krasnogvardeyskaya is a Moscow Metro station in the Zyablikovo District, Southern Administrative Okrug, Moscow. It is on the Zamoskvoretskaya Line, between Domodedovskaya and Alma-Atinskaya. Krasnogvardeyskaya opened on 7 September 1985 and was named after the former Krasnogvardeysky district.

Location
The station is located in the Zyablikovo District. Entrances lead to Orekhovy boulevard, Musa Dzhalil and Yasenevaya streets.

Transfer
Krasnogvardeyskaya is a transfer station. The transfer to Zyablikovo station which belongs to Lyublinsko-Dmitrovskaya Line was opened on 2 December 2011. At the time of opening the transfer, both Krasnogvardeyskaya and Zyablikovo were the terminal stations on their respective lines.

Building
Krasnogvardeyskaya was designed by architects I. Petukhova and N. Shumakov. It is a vault-type station with a coffered ceiling and walls faced with red marble, similar to the architecture of many of the stations on the Washington Metro in Washington, DC. The theme of the station's decorative elements, which include stained-glass panels by L. Berlin, is "The Red Guards of Moscow, 1917."

References

Moscow Metro stations
Railway stations in Russia opened in 1985
Zamoskvoretskaya Line
Railway stations located underground in Russia